Richard Spendlove MBE (born 16 June 1939) is a retired British radio presenter/producer television writer.

Life and work
Spendlove was born in Carlton in Nottinghamshire. He worked for British Railways for 35 years, and in 1963 was appointed Relief Station Master at Ely in Cambridgeshire. He retired from the railways in 1989 at the age of 50, to pursue a career in broadcasting.

With David Croft he wrote and created a BBC TV comedy series, Oh, Doctor Beeching!, which ran on BBC One between 1995 and 1997 The series ran for two series,The series was axed due to unsatisfactory viewing figures and due to this has never been re-shown in the UK as of 2022, but has been released on DVD

From 1989 until 2017, Spendlove worked for BBC Local Radio as the host of his long-running Saturday night music and phone-in show, which was simulcast from BBC Radio Cambridgeshire and also broadcast on the Eastern Counties radio stations, Radio Norfolk, Radio Suffolk, Radio Essex, BBC Three Counties Radio, Radio Northampton and Radio Kent. In January 1994, an Early day motion tabled in the House of Commons after a break in its broadcasting received a total of fifteen signatures. It was believed to be the longest running phone-in chat show on British Radio. He also presented in the afternoons on BBC Radio Cambridgeshire until 16 June 2017, his 78th birthday.

Since then, the Saturday night show format has returned on and off. From 4 December 2017 to 25 March 2018, Spendlove returned to broadcast the show on Mildenhall, Suffolk based community station Zack FM, on Monday nights and later Sunday nights. From late 2018 to May 2020, the show was broadcast live, on and off, on selected Saturday and later Sunday evenings online, and had a dedicated Facebook page.

Spendlove was awarded the MBE for "Services to Regional and Local Radio Broadcasting" in 2000.

In 2016, the BBC was critical of his use of his show to gain support for a convicted Royal Marine murderer.

Spendlove now lives in Harston, Cambridgeshire.

He and his wife Betty, who sat opposite him in the studio during his Saturday night show's entire run on the BBC, married in November 1960. She died in August 2021.

References

1939 births
BBC radio presenters
British radio presenters
British Rail people
British television writers
Living people
Members of the Order of the British Empire
People from Carlton, Nottinghamshire